Vincent Ngongang (born 9 January 1979) is a former Cameroonian footballer.

Career
He began his career playing for Racing Bafoussam alongside Geremi. After spells in Germany and Austria he settled in Serbia where he played the remainder of his career. Since ending his playing career he has become youth team coach at FK Grafičar Beograd.

External links
 Profile at Freebase

1979 births
Living people
People from Bafoussam
Cameroonian footballers
Cameroonian expatriate footballers
Association football defenders
Association football midfielders
Association football utility players
Fortuna Düsseldorf players
Expatriate footballers in Germany
Expatriate footballers in Serbia
Expatriate footballers in Serbia and Montenegro